Tridib Mitra (born 31 December 1940) was an anti-establishment writer and part of the Hungry generation movement in Bengali literature. Mitra  along with his wife, Alo Mitra, edited Hungry generation magazines "The Waste Paper" in English and "Unmarga" in Bengali. Mitra and his wife started poetry readings in burning ghats, graveyards, river banks, and country liquor joints of Kolkata. He rose to prominence in the sixties during the Hungry generation literary movement. Mitra and his wife delivered Hungry generation masks of demons, jokers, gods etc. at the offices and houses of ministers, administrators, newspaper editors and other bureaucrats of the West Bengali establishment.

Works

Ghulghuli (Poetry) 1965
Hatyakando (Poetry) 1967

See also
Falguni Roy
Samir Roychoudhury
Subimal Basak
Shakti Chattopadhyay
Malay Roy Choudhury
Basudeb Dasgupta
Sandipan Chattopadhyay

References

An assessment of Mitra's Firebrand Discourse
Tridib Mitra the poet
Van Tulsi Ka Gandh by Phanishwar Nath 'Renu', Rajkamal Prakashan, Delhi (1984)
Intrepid Edited by Carl Weissner, Buffalo, NY, US (1968)
Salted Feathers Edited by Dick Bakken. Portland, Oregon, US (1967)
City Lights Journal No 1, Edited by Lawrence Ferlinghetti, San Francisco, California, US (1963)
El Corno Emplumado No 9, Edited by Margaret Randall, Argentina (1964)
Kulchur No 15 Edited by Lita Hornick, New York, US (1964)
Indian Poetry Edited by Prof Howard McCord, Bowling Green State University, US (1965)
Hungry Kingbadanti Written by Malay Roy Choudhury, Dey Books, Kolkata (1996)
Hungry Shruti O Shastrovirodhi Andolon by Dr Uttam Das, Mahadiganto Publishers, Kolkata 700 144 (1986)

External links
Tridib Mitra's Poetry of Protest
Tridib Mitra and other Hungry generation members: Photographs
TIME magazine news about the movement
Tridib Mitra's paper on Hungryalist Influence on Allen Ginsberg

20th-century Bengali poets
University of Calcutta alumni
20th-century Indian poets
Bengali-language writers
Poets from West Bengal
Writers from Kolkata
Hungry generation
Bengali male poets
Indian male poets
20th-century Indian male writers